Luis Jiménez (1586–1636) was a Roman Catholic prelate who served as Bishop of Ugento (1627–1636).

Biography
Luis Jiménez was born in Cuenca, Spain and ordained a priest in the Order of the Blessed Virgin Mary of Mercy.

On 3 June 1627, he was selected (nominated) as Bishop of Ugento by King Philip IV of Spain, and, on 30 August 1627, confirmed by Pope Urban VIII. On 8 September 1627, he was consecrated bishop by Cosimo de Torres, Cardinal-Priest of San Pancrazio with Giuseppe Acquaviva, Titular Archbishop of Thebae, and Francesco Nappi (bishop), Bishop of Polignano, as co-consecrators. He served as Bishop of Ugento until his death in 1636.

References

External links and additional sources
 (for Chronology of Bishops) 
 (for Chronology of Bishops) 

1586 births
1636 deaths
17th-century Italian Roman Catholic bishops
Bishops appointed by Pope Urban VIII
Mercedarian bishops
People from Cuenca, Spain